N,N-Dimethyltryptamine (DMT or N,N-DMT, SPL026) is a substituted tryptamine that occurs in many plants and animals, including human beings, and which is both a derivative and a structural analog of tryptamine. It is used as a psychedelic drug and prepared by various cultures for ritual purposes as an entheogen. 

DMT has a rapid onset, intense effects, and a relatively short duration of action. For those reasons, DMT was known as the "businessman's trip" during the 1960s in the United States, as a user could access the full depth of a psychedelic experience in considerably less time than with other substances such as LSD or psilocybin mushrooms. DMT can be inhaled, ingested, or injected and its effects depend on the dose, as well as the mode of administration. When inhaled or injected, the effects last a short period of time: about five to 15 minutes. Effects can last three hours or more when orally ingested along with a monoamine oxidase inhibitor (MAOI), such as the ayahuasca brew of many native Amazonian tribes. DMT can produce vivid "projections" of mystical experiences involving euphoria and dynamic pseudohallucinations of geometric forms.

DMT is a functional analog and structural analog of other psychedelic tryptamines such as O-acetylpsilocin (4-AcO-DMT), psilocybin (4-PO-DMT), psilocin (4-HO-DMT), O-methylbufotenin (5-MeO-DMT), and bufotenin (5-HO-DMT). Parts of the structure of DMT occur within some important biomolecules like serotonin and melatonin, making them structural analogs of DMT.

Human consumption 

DMT is produced in many species of plants often in conjunction with its close chemical relatives 5-methoxy-N,N-dimethyltryptamine (5-MeO-DMT) and bufotenin (5-OH-DMT). DMT-containing plants are commonly used in indigenous Amazonian shamanic practices. It is usually one of the main active constituents of the drink ayahuasca; however, ayahuasca is sometimes brewed with plants that do not produce DMT. It occurs as the primary psychoactive alkaloid in several plants including Mimosa tenuiflora, Diplopterys cabrerana, and Psychotria viridis. DMT is found as a minor alkaloid in snuff made from Virola bark resin in which 5-MeO-DMT is the main active alkaloid. DMT is also found as a minor alkaloid in bark, pods, and beans of Anadenanthera peregrina and Anadenanthera colubrina used to make Yopo and Vilca snuff, in which bufotenin is the main active alkaloid. Psilocin and its precursor psilocybin, an active chemical in many psilocybin mushrooms, are structurally similar to DMT.

The psychotropic effects of DMT were first studied scientifically by the Hungarian chemist and psychologist Stephen Szára, who performed research with volunteers in the mid-1950s. Szára, who later worked for the United States National Institutes of Health, had turned his attention to DMT after his order for LSD from the Swiss company Sandoz Laboratories was rejected on the grounds that the powerful psychotropic could be dangerous in the hands of a communist country.

DMT is generally not active orally unless it is combined with a monoamine oxidase inhibitor such as a reversible inhibitor of monoamine oxidase A (RIMA), for example, harmaline. Without a MAOI, the body quickly metabolizes orally administered DMT, and it therefore has no hallucinogenic effect unless the dose exceeds the body's monoamine oxidase's metabolic capacity. Other means of consumption such as vaporizing, injecting, or insufflating the drug can produce powerful hallucinations for a short time (usually less than half an hour), as the DMT reaches the brain before it can be metabolized by the body's natural monoamine oxidase. Taking an MAOI prior to vaporizing or injecting DMT prolongs and enhances the effects.

Clinical use research 
Dimethyltryptamine (DMT), an endogenous ligand of sigma-1 receptors (Sig-1Rs), acts against systemic hypoxia. Research demonstrates DMT reduces the number of apoptotic and ferroptotic cells in mammalian forebrain and supports astrocyte survival in an ischemic environment. According to these data, DMT may be considered as adjuvant pharmacological therapy in the management of acute cerebral ischemia.

DMT is studied as a potential treatment for Parkinson’s disease in a Phase 1/2 clinical trial.

SPL026 (DMT fumarate) is currently undergoing phase II clinical trials investigating its use alongside supportive psychotherapy as a potential treatment Major Depressive Disorder. Additionally, a safety study is underway to investigate the effects of combining SSRIs with SPL026.

Neuropharmocology 
Recently, researchers discovered that N,N-Dimethyltryptamine (DMT or N,N-DMT) is a potent psychoplastogen, a compound capable of promoting rapid and sustained neuroplasticity that may have wide-ranging therapeutic benefit. 

Quantities of dimethyltryptamine and O-methylbufotenin were found present in the cerebrospinal fluid of humans in a psychiatric study.

Effects

Subjective psychedelic experiences
Induced DMT experiences can include profound time-dilation, visual, auditory, tactile, and proprioceptive distortions and hallucinations, and other experiences that, by most firsthand accounts, defy verbal or visual description. Examples include perceiving hyperbolic geometry or seeing Escher-like impossible objects.

Several scientific experimental studies have tried to measure subjective experiences of altered states of consciousness induced by drugs under highly controlled and safe conditions.

Rick Strassman and his colleagues conducted a five-year-long DMT study at the University of New Mexico in the 1990s. The results provided insight about the quality of subjective psychedelic experiences. In this study participants received the DMT dosage via intravenous injection and the findings suggested that different psychedelic experiences can occur, depending on the level of dosage. Lower doses (0.01 and 0.05 mg/kg) produced some aesthetic and emotional responses, but not hallucinogenic experiences (e.g., 0.05 mg/kg had mild mood elevating and calming properties). In contrast, responses produced by higher doses (0.2 and 0.4 mg/kg) researchers labeled as "hallucinogenic" that elicited "intensely colored, rapidly moving display of visual images, formed, abstract or both". Comparing to other sensory modalities the most affected was the visual. Participants reported visual hallucinations, fewer auditory hallucinations and specific physical sensations progressing to a sense of bodily dissociation, as well as to experiences of euphoria, calm, fear, and anxiety. These dose-dependent effects match well with anonymously posted "trip reports" online, where users report "breakthroughs" above certain doses.

Strassman also stressed the importance of the context where the drug has been taken. He claimed that DMT has no beneficial effects of itself, rather the context when and where people take it plays an important role.

It appears that DMT can induce a state or feeling where the person believes to "communicate with other intelligent-life forms" (see "machine elves"). High doses of DMT produce a state that involves a sense of "another intelligence" that people sometimes describe as "super-intelligent", but "emotionally detached".

A 1995 study by Adolf Dittrich and Daniel Lamparter found that the DMT-induced altered state of consciousness (ASC) is strongly influenced by habitual rather than situative factors. In the study, researchers used three dimensions of the APZ questionnaire to examine ASC. The first dimension, oceanic boundlessness (OB), refers to dissolution of ego boundaries and is mostly associated with positive emotions. The second dimension, anxious ego-dissolution (AED), represents a disordering of thoughts and decreases in autonomy and self-control. Last, visionary restructuralization (VR) refers to auditory/visual illusions and hallucinations. Results showed strong effects within the first and third dimensions for all conditions, especially with DMT, and suggested strong intrastability of elicited reactions independently of the condition for the OB and VR scales.

Reported encounters with external entities

Entities perceived during DMT inebriation have been represented in diverse forms of psychedelic art. The term machine elf was coined by ethnobotanist Terence McKenna for the entities he encountered in DMT "hyperspace", also using terms like fractal elves, or self-transforming machine elves. McKenna first encountered the "machine elves" after smoking DMT in Berkeley in 1965. His subsequent speculations regarding the hyperdimensional space in which they were encountered have inspired a great many artists and musicians, and the meaning of DMT entities has been a subject of considerable debate among participants in a networked cultural underground, enthused by McKenna's effusive accounts of DMT hyperspace. Cliff Pickover has also written about the "machine elf" experience, in the book Sex, Drugs, Einstein, & Elves. Strassman noted similarities between self-reports of his DMT study participants' encounters with these "entities", and mythological descriptions of figures such as Ḥayyot haq-Qodesh in ancient religions, including both angels and demons. Strassman also argues for a similarity in his study participants' descriptions of mechanized wheels, gears and machinery in these encounters, with those described in visions of encounters with the Living Creatures and Ophanim of the Hebrew Bible, noting they may stem from a common neuropsychopharmacological experience.

Strassman argues that the more positive of the "external entities" encountered in DMT experiences should be understood as analogous to certain forms of angels: 
Strassman's experimental participants also note that some other entities can subjectively resemble creatures more like insects and aliens. As a result, Strassman writes these experiences among his experimental participants "also left me feeling confused and concerned about where the spirit molecule was leading us. It was at this point that I began to wonder if I was getting in over my head with this research."

Hallucinations of strange creatures had been reported by Stephen Szara in a 1958 study in psychotic patients, in which he described how one of his subjects under the influence of DMT had experienced "strange creatures, dwarves or something" at the beginning of a DMT trip.

Other researchers of the entities seemingly encountered by DMT users describe them as "entities" or "beings" in humanoid as well as animal form, with descriptions of "little people" being common (non-human gnomes, elves, imps, etc.). Strassman and others have speculated that this form of hallucination may be the cause of alien abduction and extraterrestrial encounter experiences, which may occur through endogenously-occurring DMT.

Likening them to descriptions of rattling and chattering auditory phenomena described in encounters with the Hayyoth in the Book of Ezekiel, Rick Strassman notes that participants in his studies, when reporting encounters with the alleged entities, have also described loud auditory hallucinations, such as one subject reporting typically "the elves laughing or talking at high volume, chattering, twittering".

Near-death experience
A 2018 study found significant relationships between a DMT experience and a near-death experience. A 2019 large-scale study pointed that ketamine, Salvia divinorum, and DMT (and other classical psychedelic substances) may be linked to near-death experiences due to the semantic similarity of reports associated with the use of psychoactive compounds and NDE narratives, but the study concluded that with the current data it is neither possible to corroborate nor refute the hypothesis that the release of an endogenous ketamine-like neuroprotective agent underlies NDE phenomenology.

Physiological response
According to a dose-response study in human subjects, dimethyltryptamine administered intravenously slightly elevated blood pressure, heart rate, pupil diameter, and rectal temperature, in addition to elevating blood concentrations of beta-endorphin, corticotropin, cortisol, and prolactin; growth hormone blood levels rise equally in response to all doses of DMT, and melatonin levels were unaffected."

Dependence liability
The dependence potential of DMT and the risk of sustained psychological disturbance may be minimal when used infrequently, as in religious ceremonies; however, the physiological dependence potential of DMT and ayahuasca has not yet been documented convincingly.

Conjecture regarding endogenous effects
In the 1950s, the endogenous production of psychoactive agents was considered to be a potential explanation for the hallucinatory symptoms of some psychiatric diseases; this is known as the transmethylation hypothesis. Several speculative and yet untested hypotheses suggest that endogenous DMT is produced in the human brain and is involved in certain psychological and neurological states. DMT is naturally occurring in small amounts in rat brain, human cerebrospinal fluid, and other tissues of humans and other mammals. Further, mRNA for the enzyme necessary for the production of DMT, INMT, are expressed in the human cerebral cortex, choroid plexus, and pineal gland, suggesting an endogenous role in the human brain.  In 2011, Nicholas V. Cozzi, of the University of Wisconsin School of Medicine and Public Health, concluded that INMT, an enzyme that is associated with the biosynthesis of DMT and endogenous hallucinogens, is present in the primate (rhesus macaque) pineal gland, retinal ganglion neurons, and spinal cord. Neurobiologist Andrew Gallimore (2013) suggested that while DMT might not have a modern neural function, it may have been an ancestral neuromodulator once secreted in psychedelic concentrations during REM sleep, a function now lost.

Routes of administration

Inhalation 

A standard dose for vaporized DMT is 20–60 milligrams, depending highly on the efficiency of vaporization as well as body weight and personal variation. In general, this is inhaled in a few successive breaths, but lower doses can be used if the user can inhale it in fewer breaths (ideally one). The effects last for a short period of time, usually 5 to 15 minutes, dependent on the dose. The onset after inhalation is very fast (less than 45 seconds) and peak effects are reached within a minute. In the 1960s, DMT was known as a "businessman's trip" in the US because of the relatively short duration (and rapid onset) of action when inhaled. DMT can be inhaled using a bong, typically when sandwiched between layers of plant matter, using a specially designed pipe, or by using an e-cigarette once it has been dissolved in propylene glycol and/or vegetable glycerin. Some users have also started using vaporizers meant for cannabis extracts ("wax pens") for ease of temperature control when vaporizing crystals. A DMT-infused smoking blend is called Changa, and is typically used in pipes or other utensils meant for smoking dried plant matter.

Injection
In a study conducted from 1990 through 1995, University of New Mexico psychiatrist Rick Strassman found that some volunteers injected with high doses of DMT reported experiences with perceived alien entities. Usually, the reported entities were experienced as the inhabitants of a perceived independent reality that the subjects reported visiting while under the influence of DMT.

Oral ingestion

DMT is broken down by the enzyme monoamine oxidase through a process called deamination, and is quickly inactivated orally unless combined with a monoamine oxidase inhibitor (MAOI). The traditional South American beverage ayahuasca, or yage, is derived by boiling the ayahuasca vine (Banisteriopsis caapi) with leaves of one or more plants containing DMT, such as Psychotria viridis, Psychotria carthagenensis, or Diplopterys cabrerana. The Ayahuasca vine contains harmala alkaloids, highly active reversible inihibitors of monoamine oxidase A (RIMAs), rendering the DMT orally active by protecting it from deamination. A variety of different recipes are used to make the brew depending on the purpose of the ayahuasca session, or local availability of ingredients. Two common sources of DMT in the western US are reed canary grass (Phalaris arundinacea) and Harding grass (Phalaris aquatica). These invasive grasses contain low levels of DMT and other alkaloids but also contain gramine, which is toxic and difficult to separate. In addition, Jurema (Mimosa tenuiflora) shows evidence of DMT content: the pink layer in the inner rootbark of this small tree contains a high concentration of N,N-DMT.

Taken orally with an RIMA, DMT produces a long-lasting (over three hours), slow, deep metaphysical experience similar to that of psilocybin mushrooms, but more intense. RIMAs should be used with caution as they can have fatal interactions with some prescription drugs such as SSRI antidepressants, and some over-the-counter drugs known as sympathomimetics such as ephedrine or certain cough medicines and even some herbal remedies.

The intensity of orally administered DMT depends on the type and dose of MAOI administered alongside it. When ingested with 120mg of harmine (a RIMA and member of the harmala alkaloids), 20mg of DMT was reported to have psychoactive effects by author and ethnobotanist Jonathan Ott. Ott reported that to produce a visionary state, the threshold oral dose was 30mg DMT alongside 120mg harmine. This is not necessarily indicative of a standard dose, as dose-dependent effects may vary due to individual variations in drug metabolism.

History 

Naturally occurring substances (of both vegetable and animal origin) containing DMT have been used in South America since pre-Columbian times.

DMT was first synthesized in 1931 by chemist Richard Helmuth Fredrick Manske (born 1901 in Berlin, Germany – 1977). In general, its discovery as a natural product is credited to Brazilian chemist and microbiologist Oswaldo Gonçalves de Lima (1908–1989) who, in 1946, isolated an alkaloid he named nigerina (nigerine) from the root bark of jurema preta, that is, Mimosa tenuiflora. However, in a careful review of the case Jonathan Ott shows that the empirical formula for nigerine determined by Gonçalves de Lima, which notably contains an atom of oxygen, can match only a partial, "impure" or "contaminated" form of DMT. It was only in 1959, when Gonçalves de Lima provided American chemists a sample of Mimosa tenuiflora roots, that DMT was unequivocally identified in this plant material. Less ambiguous is the case of isolation and formal identification of DMT in 1955 in seeds and pods of Anadenanthera peregrina by a team of American chemists led by Evan Horning (1916–1993). Since 1955, DMT has been found in a host of organisms: in at least fifty plant species belonging to ten families, and in at least four animal species, including one gorgonian and three mammalian species (including humans).

In terms of a scientific understanding, the hallucinogenic properties of DMT were not uncovered until 1956 by Hungarian chemist and psychiatrist Stephen Szara. In his paper “Dimethyltryptamin: Its Metabolism in Man;
the Relation of its Psychotic Effect to the
Serotonin Metabolism”, Szara employed synthetic DMT, synthesized by the method of Speeter and Anthony, which was then administered to 20 volunteers by intramuscular injection. Urine samples were collected from these volunteers for the identification of DMT metabolites. This is considered to be the converging link between the chemical structure DMT to its cultural consumption as a psychoactive and religious sacrament.

Another historical milestone is the discovery of DMT in plants frequently used by Amazonian natives as additive to the vine Banisteriopsis caapi to make ayahuasca decoctions. In 1957, American chemists Francis Hochstein and Anita Paradies identified DMT in an "aqueous extract" of leaves of a plant they named Prestonia amazonicum [sic] and described as "commonly mixed" with B. caapi. The lack of a proper botanical identification of Prestonia amazonica in this study led American ethnobotanist Richard Evans Schultes (1915–2001) and other scientists to raise serious doubts about the claimed plant identity. The mistake likely led the writer William Burroughs to regard the DMT he experimented with in Tangier in 1961 as "Prestonia". Better evidence was produced in 1965 by French pharmacologist Jacques Poisson, who isolated DMT as a sole alkaloid from leaves, provided and used by Aguaruna Indians, identified as having come from the vine Diplopterys cabrerana (then known as Banisteriopsis rusbyana). Published in 1970, the first identification of DMT in the plant Psychotria viridis, another common additive of ayahuasca, was made by a team of American researchers led by pharmacologist Ara der Marderosian. Not only did they detect DMT in leaves of P. viridis obtained from Kaxinawá indigenous people, but they also were the first to identify it in a sample of an ayahuasca decoction, prepared by the same indigenous people.

Legal status

International law 

Internationally DMT is illegal, but ayahuasca and DMT brews and preparations are lawful. DMT is controlled by the Convention on Psychotropic Substances at the international level. The Convention makes it illegal to possess, buy, purchase, sell, to retail and to dispense without a licence.

By country and continent

In some countries ayahuasca is a forbidden or controlled or regulated substance  while in other countries it is not a controlled substance or its production, consumption, and sale, is allowed to various degrees.

Asia
 Israel – DMT is an illegal substance; production, trade and possession are prosecuted as crimes.
 India – DMT is completely illegal to produce, transport, trade in or possess with a minimum prison or jail punishment of ten years.

Europe
 France – DMT, along with most of its plant sources, is classified as a stupéfiant (narcotic).
 Germany – DMT is prohibited as a class I drug.
Republic of Ireland – DMT is an illegal Schedule 1 drug under the Misuse of Drugs Acts. An attempt in 2014 by a member of the Santo Daime church to gain a religious exemption to import the drug failed.
 Latvia — DMT is prohibited as a Schedule I drug.
 Netherlands – The drug is banned as it is classified as a List 1 Drug per the Opium Law. Production, trade and possession of DMT are prohibited.
 Russia – Classified as a Schedule I narcotic, including its derivatives (see sumatriptan and zolmitriptan).
 Serbia –  DMT, along with stereoisomers and salts is classified as List 4 (Psychotropic substances) substance according to Act on Control of Psychoactive Substances.
 Sweden - DMT is considered a Schedule 1 drug. The Swedish supreme court concluded in 2018 that possession of processed plant material containing a significant amount of DMT is illegal. However, possession of unprocessed such plant material was ruled legal. 
 United Kingdom – DMT is classified as a Class A drug.
 Belgium - DMT cannot be possessed, sold, purchased or imported. Usage is not specifically prohibited, but since usage implies possession one could be prosecuted that way.

North America
 Canada – DMT is classified as a Schedule III drug under the Controlled Drugs and Substances Act, but is legal for religious groups to use. As of 2022 DMT has been decriminalized in Vancouver, and there are now several outlets which openly sell this substance in numerous forms.

In 2017 the Santo Daime Church Céu do Montréal received religious exemption to use Ayahuasca as a sacrament in their rituals.

United States – DMT is classified in the United States as a Schedule I drug under the Controlled Substances Act of 1970.

In December 2004, the Supreme Court lifted a stay, thereby allowing the Brazil-based União do Vegetal (UDV) church to use a decoction containing DMT in their Christmas services that year. This decoction is a tea made from boiled leaves and vines, known as hoasca within the UDV, and ayahuasca in different cultures. In Gonzales v. O Centro Espírita Beneficente União do Vegetal, the Supreme Court heard arguments on 1 November 2005, and unanimously ruled in February 2006 that the U.S. federal government must allow the UDV to import and consume the tea for religious ceremonies under the 1993 Religious Freedom Restoration Act.

In September 2008, the three Santo Daime churches filed suit in federal court to gain legal status to import DMT-containing ayahuasca tea. The case, Church of the Holy Light of the Queen v. Mukasey, presided over by Judge Owen M. Panner, was ruled in favor of the Santo Daime church. As of 21 March 2009, a federal judge says members of the church in Ashland can import, distribute and brew ayahuasca. U.S. District Judge Owen Panner issued a permanent injunction barring the government from prohibiting or penalizing the sacramental use of "Daime tea". Panner's order said activities of The Church of the Holy Light of the Queen are legal and protected under freedom of religion. His order prohibits the federal government from interfering with and prosecuting church members who follow a list of regulations set out in his order.

Oceania
 New Zealand – DMT is classified as a Class A drug under the Misuse of Drugs Act 1975.
 Australia – DMT is listed as a Schedule 9 prohibited substance in Australia under the Poisons Standard (October 2015). A schedule 9 drug is outlined in the Poisons Act 1964 as "Substances which may be abused or misused, the manufacture, possession, sale or use of which should be prohibited by law except when required for medical or scientific research, or for analytical, teaching or training purposes with approval of the CEO."                                                                                                                                                                                                                                                                             Between 2011 and 2012, the Australian Federal Government was considering changes to the Australian Criminal Code that would classify any plants containing any amount of DMT as "controlled plants". DMT itself was already controlled under current laws. The proposed changes included other similar blanket bans for other substances, such as a ban on any and all plants containing Mescaline or Ephedrine. The proposal was not pursued after political embarrassment on realisation that this would make the official Floral Emblem of Australia, Acacia pycnantha (Golden Wattle), illegal. The Therapeutic Goods Administration and federal authority had considered a motion to ban the same, but this was withdrawn in May 2012 (as DMT may still hold potential entheogenic value to native and/or religious people).                                                                                                                                                                                                                                                                           Under the Misuse of Drugs act 1981 6.0 g of DMT is considered enough to determine a court of trial and 2.0 g is considered intent to sell and supply.

Chemistry
DMT is commonly handled and stored as a  hemifumarate, as other DMT acid salts are extremely hygroscopic and will not readily crystallize. Its freebase form, although less stable than DMT hemifumarate, is favored by recreational users choosing to vaporize the chemical as it has a lower boiling point.

Biosynthesis

Dimethyltryptamine is an indole alkaloid derived from the shikimate pathway. Its biosynthesis is relatively simple and summarized in the adjacent picture. In plants, the parent amino acid L-tryptophan is produced endogenously where in animals L-tryptophan is an essential amino acid coming from diet. No matter the source of L-tryptophan, the biosynthesis begins with its decarboxylation by an aromatic amino acid decarboxylase (AADC) enzyme (step 1). The resulting decarboxylated tryptophan analog is tryptamine. Tryptamine then undergoes a transmethylation (step 2): the enzyme indolethylamine-N-methyltransferase (INMT) catalyzes the transfer of a methyl group from cofactor S-adenosyl-methionine (SAM), via nucleophilic attack, to tryptamine. This reaction transforms SAM into S-adenosylhomocysteine (SAH), and gives the intermediate product N-methyltryptamine (NMT). NMT is in turn transmethylated by the same process (step 3) to form the end product N,N-dimethyltryptamine. Tryptamine transmethylation is regulated by two products of the reaction: SAH, and DMT were shown ex vivo to be among the most potent inhibitors of rabbit INMT activity.

This transmethylation mechanism has been repeatedly and consistently proven by radiolabeling of SAM methyl group with carbon-14 (14C-CH3)SAM.

Laboratory synthesis
DMT can be synthesized through several possible pathways from different starting materials. The two most commonly encountered synthetic routes are through the reaction of indole with oxalyl chloride followed by reaction with dimethylamine and reduction of the carbonyl functionalities with lithium aluminum hydride to form DMT. The second commonly encountered route is through the n,n-dimethylation of tryptamine using formaldehyde followed by reduction with sodium cyanoborohydride or sodium triacetoxyborohydride. Sodium borohydride can be used but requires a larger excess of reagents and lower temperatures due to it having a higher selectivity for carbonyl groups as opposed to imines.  Procedures using sodium cyanoborohydride and sodium triacetoxyborohydride (presumably created in situ from cyanoborohydride though this may not be the case due to the presence of water and/or methanol) also result in the creation of cyanated tryptamine and beta-carboline by-products of unknown toxicity while using sodium borohydride in absence of acid does not. Bufotenine, a plant extract, can also be synthesized into DMT. Alternatively methyl iodide can be used but this results in the creation of a quaternary ammonium salt which must be transformed back into a tertiary amine.

Clandestine manufacture

In a clandestine setting, DMT is not typically synthesized due to the lack of availability of the starting materials, namely tryptamine and oxalyl chloride. Instead, it is more often extracted from plant sources using a non-polar hydrocarbon solvent such as naphtha or heptane, and a base such as sodium hydroxide.

Alternatively, an acid-base extraction is sometimes used instead.

A variety of plants contain DMT at sufficient levels for being viable sources, but specific plants such as Mimosa tenuiflora, Acacia acuminata and Acacia confusa are most often used.

The chemicals involved in the extraction are commonly available. The plant material may be illegal to procure in some countries. The end product (DMT) is illegal in most countries.

Evidence in mammals 

Published in Science in 1961, Julius Axelrod found an N-methyltransferase enzyme capable of mediating biotransformation of tryptamine into DMT in a rabbit's lung. This finding initiated a still ongoing scientific interest in endogenous DMT production in humans and other mammals. From then on, two major complementary lines of evidence have been investigated: localization and further characterization of the N-methyltransferase enzyme, and analytical studies looking for endogenously produced DMT in body fluids and tissues.

In 2013, researchers reported DMT in the pineal gland microdialysate of rodents.

A study published in 2014 reported the biosynthesis of N,N-dimethyltryptamine (DMT) in the human melanoma cell line SK-Mel-147 including details on its metabolism by peroxidases.
It is assumed that more than half of the amount of DMT produced by the acidophilic cells of the pineal gland is secreted before and during death, the amount being 0.0025-0.0034 g/kg. However, this claim by Strassman has been criticized by David Nichols who notes that DMT does not appear to be produced in any meaningful amount by the pineal gland. Removal or calcification of the pineal gland does not induce any of the symptoms caused by removal of DMT. The symptoms presented are consistent solely with reduction in melatonin, which is the pineal gland's known function. Nichols instead suggests that dynorphin and other endorphins are responsible for the reported euphoria experienced by patients during a near-death experience.
In 2014, researchers demonstrated the immunomodulatory potential of DMT and 5-MeO-DMT through the Sigma-1 receptor of human immune cells. This immunomodulatory activity may contribute to significant anti-inflammatory effects and tissue regeneration.

Endogenous DMT 

N,N-dimethyltryptamine (DMT), a psychedelic compound identified endogenously in mammals, is biosynthesized by aromatic-L-amino acid decarboxylase (AADC) and indolethylamine-N-methyltransferase (INMT). Studies have investigated brain expression of INMT transcript in rats and humans, co-expression of INMT and AADC mRNA in rat brain and periphery, and brain concentrations of DMT in rats. INMT transcripts were identified in the cerebral cortex, pineal gland, and choroid plexus of both rats and humans via in situ hybridization. Notably, INMT mRNA was colocalized with AADC transcript in rat brain tissues, in contrast to rat peripheral tissues where there existed little overlapping expression of INMT with AADC transcripts. Additionally, extracellular concentrations of DMT in the cerebral cortex of normal behaving rats, with or without the pineal gland, were similar to those of canonical monoamine neurotransmitters including serotonin. A significant increase of DMT levels in the rat visual cortex was observed following induction of experimental cardiac arrest, a finding independent of an intact pineal gland. These results show for the first time that the rat brain is capable of synthesizing and releasing DMT at concentrations comparable to known monoamine neurotransmitters and raise the possibility that this phenomenon may occur similarly in human brains.

The first claimed detection of mammalian endogenous DMT was published in June 1965: German researchers F. Franzen and H. Gross report to have evidenced and quantified DMT, along with its structural analog bufotenin (5-HO-DMT), in human blood and urine. In an article published four months later, the method used in their study was strongly criticized, and the credibility of their results challenged.

Few of the analytical methods used prior to 2001 to measure levels of endogenously formed DMT had enough sensitivity and selectivity to produce reliable results. Gas chromatography, preferably coupled to mass spectrometry (GC-MS), is considered a minimum requirement. A study published in 2005 implements the most sensitive and selective method ever used to measure endogenous DMT: liquid chromatography-tandem mass spectrometry with electrospray ionization (LC-ESI-MS/MS) allows for reaching limits of detection (LODs) 12 to 200 fold lower than those attained by the best methods employed in the 1970s. The data summarized in the table below are from studies conforming to the abovementioned requirements (abbreviations used: CSF = cerebrospinal fluid; LOD = limit of detection; n = number of samples; ng/L and ng/kg = nanograms (10−9 g) per litre, and nanograms per kilogram, respectively):

A 2013 study found DMT in microdialysate obtained from a rat's pineal gland, providing evidence of endogenous DMT in the mammalian brain. In 2019 experiments showed that the rat brain is capable of synthesizing and releasing DMT. These results raise the possibility that this phenomenon may occur similarly in human brains.

Detection in body fluids
DMT may be measured in blood, plasma or urine using chromatographic techniques as a diagnostic tool in clinical poisoning situations or to aid in the medicolegal investigation of suspicious deaths. In general, blood or plasma DMT levels in recreational users of the drug are in the 10–30 μg/L range during the first several hours post-ingestion. Less than 0.1% of an oral dose is eliminated unchanged in the 24-hour urine of humans.

INMT

Before techniques of molecular biology were used to localize indolethylamine N-methyltransferase (INMT), characterization and localization went on a par: samples of the biological material where INMT is hypothesized to be active are subject to enzyme assay. Those enzyme assays are performed either with a radiolabeled methyl donor like (14C-CH3)SAM to which known amounts of unlabeled substrates like tryptamine are added or with addition of a radiolabeled substrate like (14C)NMT to demonstrate in vivo formation. As qualitative determination of the radioactively tagged product of the enzymatic reaction is sufficient to characterize INMT existence and activity (or lack of), analytical methods used in INMT assays are not required to be as sensitive as those needed to directly detect and quantify the minute amounts of endogenously formed DMT (see DMT subsection below). The essentially qualitative method thin layer chromatography (TLC) was thus used in a vast majority of studies. Also, robust evidence that INMT can catalyze transmethylation of tryptamine into NMT and DMT could be provided with reverse isotope dilution analysis coupled to mass spectrometry for rabbit and human lung during the early 1970s.

Selectivity rather than sensitivity proved to be an Achilles' heel for some TLC methods with the discovery in 1974–1975 that incubating rat blood cells or brain tissue with (14C-CH3)SAM and NMT as substrate mostly yields tetrahydro-β-carboline derivatives, and negligible amounts of DMT in brain tissue. It is indeed simultaneously realized that the TLC methods used thus far in almost all published studies on INMT and DMT biosynthesis are incapable to resolve DMT from those tetrahydro-β-carbolines. These findings are a blow for all previous claims of evidence of INMT activity and DMT biosynthesis in avian and mammalian brain, including in vivo, as they all relied upon use of the problematic TLC methods: their validity is doubted in replication studies that make use of improved TLC methods, and fail to evidence DMT-producing INMT activity in rat and human brain tissues. Published in 1978, the last study attempting to evidence in vivo INMT activity and DMT production in brain (rat) with TLC methods finds biotransformation of radiolabeled tryptamine into DMT to be real but "insignificant". Capability of the method used in this latter study to resolve DMT from tetrahydro-β-carbolines is questioned later.
To localize INMT, a qualitative leap is accomplished with use of modern techniques of molecular biology, and of immunohistochemistry. In humans, a gene encoding INMT is determined to be located on chromosome 7. Northern blot analyses reveal INMT messenger RNA (mRNA) to be highly expressed in rabbit lung, and in human thyroid, adrenal gland, and lung. Intermediate levels of expression are found in human heart, skeletal muscle, trachea, stomach, small intestine, pancreas, testis, prostate, placenta, lymph node, and spinal cord. Low to very low levels of expression are noted in rabbit brain, and human thymus, liver, spleen, kidney, colon, ovary, and bone marrow. INMT mRNA expression is absent in human peripheral blood leukocytes, whole brain, and in tissue from 7 specific brain regions (thalamus, subthalamic nucleus, caudate nucleus, hippocampus, amygdala, substantia nigra, and corpus callosum). Immunohistochemistry showed INMT to be present in large amounts in glandular epithelial cells of small and large intestines. In 2011, immunohistochemistry revealed the presence of INMT in primate nervous tissue including retina, spinal cord motor neurons, and pineal gland. A 2020 study using in-situ hybridization, a far more accurate tool than the northern blot analysis, found mRNA coding for INMT expressed in the human cerebral cortex, choroid plexus, and pineal gland.

Pharmacology

Pharmacokinetics
DMT peak level concentrations (Cmax) measured in whole blood after intramuscular (IM) injection (0.7 mg/kg, n = 11) and in plasma following intravenous (IV) administration (0.4 mg/kg, n = 10) of fully psychedelic doses are in the range of ≈14 to 154 μg/L and 32 to 204 μg/L, respectively.
The corresponding molar concentrations of DMT are therefore in the range of 0.074–0.818 μM in whole blood and 0.170–1.08 μM in plasma. However, several studies have described active transport and accumulation of DMT into rat and dog brain following peripheral administration.
Similar active transport, and accumulation processes likely occur in human brain and may concentrate DMT in brain by several-fold or more (relatively to blood), resulting in local concentrations in the micromolar or higher range. Such concentrations would be commensurate with serotonin brain tissue concentrations, which have been consistently determined to be in the 1.5-4 μM range.

Closely coextending with peak psychedelic effects, mean time to reach peak concentrations (Tmax) was determined to be 10–15 minutes in whole blood after IM injection, and 2 minutes in plasma after IV administration. When taken orally mixed in an ayahuasca decoction, and in freeze-dried ayahuasca gel caps, DMT Tmax is considerably delayed: 107.59 ± 32.5 minutes, and 90–120 minutes, respectively.
The pharmacokinetics for vaporizing DMT have not been studied or reported.

Neurogenesis

In September 2020, an in vitro and in vivo study showed that DMT present in the ayahuasca infusion promotes neurogenesis.

Pharmacodynamics
DMT binds non-selectively with affinities < 0.6 μM to the following serotonin receptors: 5-HT1A, 5-HT1B, 5-HT1D, 5-HT2A, 5-HT2B, 5-HT2C, 5-HT6, and 5-HT7. An agonist action has been determined at 5-HT1A, 5-HT2A and 5-HT2C. Its efficacies at other serotonin receptors remain to be determined. Of special interest will be the determination of its efficacy at human 5-HT2B receptor as two in vitro assays evidenced DMT's high affinity for this receptor: 0.108 μM and 0.184 μM. This may be of importance because chronic or frequent uses of serotonergic drugs showing preferential high affinity and clear agonism at 5-HT2B receptor have been causally linked to valvular heart disease.

It has also been shown to possess affinity for the dopamine D1, α1-adrenergic, α2-adrenergic, imidazoline-1, and σ1 receptors. Converging lines of evidence established activation of the σ1 receptor at concentrations of 50–100 μM. Its efficacies at the other receptor binding sites are unclear. It has also been shown in vitro to be a substrate for the cell-surface serotonin transporter (SERT) expressed in human platelets, and the rat vesicular monoamine transporter 2 (VMAT2), which was transiently expressed in fall armyworm Sf9 cells. DMT inhibited SERT-mediated serotonin uptake into platelets at an average concentration of 4.00 ± 0.70 μM and VMAT2-mediated serotonin uptake at an average concentration of 93 ± 6.8 μM.

As with other so-called "classical hallucinogens", a large part of DMT psychedelic effects can be attributed to a functionally selective activation of the 5-HT2A receptor. DMT concentrations eliciting 50% of its maximal effect (half maximal effective concentration = EC50 or Kact) at the human 5-HT2A receptor in vitro are in the 0.118–0.983 μM range. This range of values coincides well with the range of concentrations measured in blood and plasma after administration of a fully psychedelic dose (see Pharmacokinetics).

As DMT has been shown to have slightly better efficacy (EC50) at human serotonin 2C receptor than at the 2A receptor, 5-HT2C is also likely implicated in DMT's overall effects. Other receptors, such as 5-HT1A σ1, may also play a role.

In 2009, it was hypothesized that DMT may be an endogenous ligand for the σ1 receptor. The concentration of DMT needed for σ1 activation in vitro (50–100 μM) is similar to the behaviorally active concentration measured in mouse brain of approximately 106 μM This is minimally 4 orders of magnitude higher than the average concentrations measured in rat brain tissue or human plasma under basal conditions (see Endogenous DMT), so σ1 receptors are likely to be activated only under conditions of high local DMT concentrations. If DMT is stored in synaptic vesicles, such concentrations might occur during vesicular release. To illustrate, while the average concentration of serotonin in brain tissue is in the 1.5–4 μM range, the concentration of serotonin in synaptic vesicles was measured at 270 mM. Following vesicular release, the resulting concentration of serotonin in the synaptic cleft, to which serotonin receptors are exposed, is estimated to be about 300 μM. Thus, while in vitro receptor binding affinities, efficacies, and average concentrations in tissue or plasma are useful, they are not likely to predict DMT concentrations in the vesicles or at synaptic or intracellular receptors. Under these conditions, notions of receptor selectivity are moot, and it seems probable that most of the receptors identified as targets for DMT (see above) participate in producing its psychedelic effects.

Society and culture

Black market
Electronic cigarette cartridges filled with DMT started to be sold on the black market in 2018.

See also 
 DMT-N-oxide
 Psychedelic drug
 List of psychoactive plants
 MPMI
 Serotonergic psychedelic
 Psychoplastogen
 Alexander Shulgin
 SN-22
 Rick Strassman

References

External links 

 DMT chapter from TiHKAL
 St John, Graham. 2015. Mystery School in Hyperspace: A Cultural History of DMT. Berkeley, CA.: North Atlantic Books. .

Ayahuasca
Entheogens
Tryptamine alkaloids
Psychedelic tryptamines
Serotonin receptor agonists
Dimethylamino compounds